Robert Harris Kupperman (May 12, 1935 – November 24, 2006) was an American  government official and academic, and a leading expert on terrorism.

Kupperman received his doctorate in applied mathematics from New York University in 1962 and went on to teach at the University of Maryland as well as NYU.

During his years working for the US government he served as director of the transition team for the Federal Emergency Management Agency, as executive director of the Office of Emergency Preparedness, and finally at the U.S. Arms Control and Disarmament Agency, where he helped President Nixon in creating the Cabinet Committee to Combat Terrorism. This first interagency study of foreign and domestic terrorism was created in response to the Black September terrorist attack in which 11 Israeli athletes were murdered at the 1972 Munich Olympic Games.

After he left the public sector, Kupperman joined the Center for Strategic and International Studies as an advisor and authored several books, most notably Strategic Requirements for the Army to the Year 2000 (Lexington Books, 1984) and Final Warning: Averting Disaster in the New Age of Terrorism, which he co-wrote with journalist Jeff Kamen (Doubleday, 1989)

Kupperman died in his home in Washington, D.C., aged 71. According to his daughter he had been suffering from Parkinson's disease since 1990.

External links
John A. Adam, Review of Final Warning,  The New York Times, December 24, 1989.
Tim Weiner, Obituary, The New York Times, November 26, 2006

1935 births
2006 deaths
20th-century American mathematicians
21st-century American mathematicians
20th-century American non-fiction writers
New York University alumni
New York University faculty
Neurological disease deaths in Washington, D.C.
Deaths from Parkinson's disease
People from Washington, D.C.
Place of birth missing
20th-century American male writers